Amjad Hossain (1942–2018) was a Bangladeshi filmmaker.

Amjad Hossain (also spelled Amzad) may also refer to:

 Amjad Hossain (lawyer) (c. 1935 – 2015), a Bangladeshi lawyer and politician
 Amjad Hossain (politician) (1924–1971), a Bangladesh Awami League politician
 Sardar Amjad Hossain (1940–1971), a Bangladesh Jatiya Party politician
 Gazi M M Amjad Hossain (1949–2021), a Bangladesh Awami League politician from Sirajganj
 Amjad Hussain (born 1958), a Pakistani Royal Navy officer
 Amjad Hussain Farooqi (1972–2004), a Pakistani Islamic militant
 Md. Amjad Hossain Talukdar, a Bangladesh Awami League politician from Kurigram
 Amjad Hussain B. Sial, a Pakistani diplomat
 Amzad Hossain Sarker, a Bangladesh Nationalist Party politician from Nilphamari
 Amzad Hossain (Meherpur politician), a Bangladesh Nationalist Party politician from Meherpur

See also
 Amjad